Matt Donovan may refer to:

Matt Donovan (ice hockey) (born 1990), American ice hockey defenceman
Matt Donovan (poet), American poet 
Matt Donovan (fictional character), a character on the television show The Vampire Diaries
Matt Donovan (rugby league, born 1970), Australian rugby league player
Matt Donovan (Russian rugby league), Russian international rugby league player

See also
Donovan (surname)